Evangelical Catholic Church may refer to the following:
Evangelical Catholic Church (Lutheran), a High Church Lutheran denomination founded in 1976
Evangelical Catholic Church (Independent Catholic), an Independent Catholic denomination founded in 1997

Religious organizations